Rudolf Katzer (born 1888, date of death unknown) was a German track cycling racer who competed in the 1908 Summer Olympics.

With his teammates Karl Neumer, Max Götze and Hermann Martens he won the silver medal in the team pursuit. He also competed in the 660 yards sprint, in the 5000 metres race, and in the 20 kilometres race, but each time he was eliminated in the first round. He also participated in the 100 kilometres race, but was not able to finish the race.

References

External links
 profile

1888 births
German male cyclists
German track cyclists
Cyclists at the 1908 Summer Olympics
Olympic silver medalists for Germany
Olympic cyclists of Germany
Year of death unknown
Place of birth missing
Olympic medalists in cycling
Medalists at the 1908 Summer Olympics
20th-century German people